The Kandahar Knights ( Da Kandahār Tūryālī) are a franchise cricket team which participates in the Afghanistan Premier League (APL). They joined the APL as one of its original members in 2018. Asghar Afghan was the captain for the inaugural session and English coach Kabir Ali was appointed as the head coach of the team.

Current squad

The following players listed here are in present squad.

 Soumya Sarkar, Mohammad Mithun, Iftikhar Ahmed and Wahab Riaz though were bought in the auction but they were not allowed to participate in the first edition by their respective cricket board.

Administration and Supporting Staff
Heads Coach:  Kabir Ali

References

Afghan domestic cricket competitions
Cricket clubs established in 2018
2018 in Afghan cricket
Afghanistan Premier League teams